Jonathan Victor Gerard Assous (born September 2, 1983) is a French-Israeli football player who is currently contracted to Beitar Ramat Gan in Israel. In France, Assous was widely known for his temper and rough play.

Playing career 
Assous began his professional career in the Ligue 2 with club AS Nancy. Sparingly making a league appearance, he moved down to the Championnat National to play with Nîmes. Fine performances in the Championnat earned him a contract with Angers SCO. There he grabbed headlines for his rough play which got him ejected on numerous occasions. During his stint with Créteil, he trialed with Nice and impressed then-manager Frédéric Antonetti. Unfortunately, contractual problems with Créteil ended his chance of making it to Ligue 1 for the first time in his career. Instead, Assous joined Stade Reims where he was able to carve out a spot in the starting 11.

After the successful acclimation of French midfielder Rudy Haddad to life in Israel, Maccabi decided to look for more Jewish footballers who would not count against the foreign player cap. Frenchman Kevin Pariente and Americans Benny Feilhaber and Jonathan Bornstein were originally scouted for the club. After Maccabi could not come to terms with their respective clubs, they turned to Assous who was having a good season in France. Some fans were vocally opposed to signing Assous because of his previously unsuccessful trial with Hapoel Kfar Saba and lack of "star quality".

Immediately after being bought, Assous went to the Jewish Agency offices in Paris to fill out all necessary forms for receiving Israeli citizenship under the Law of Return.

In 2008, he was joined in Israel by his brother, Gary who signed with Maccabi Netanya.

From 2009 to 2011, he was playing for Hapoel Petah Tikva.

In January 2011, he joined Hapoel Ramat Gan but the club had been relegated to Liga Leumit, so he did not want to continue in this team.

In August 2011, he joined for a second Time Hapoel Petah Tikva, club where he is liked by all ultras, for his temper, and his aggressive style of play. 
In May 2012, Hapoel Petah Tikva was relegated to Liga Leumit, but Assous decided to continue with the club, and to sign a 3 years contract, in August 2012.

In October 2014, he joined Liga Gimel club, Shimshon Tel Aviv.

See also
List of select Jewish football (association; soccer) players

Footnotes

1983 births
Living people
21st-century French Jews
French footballers
Israeli Jews
Association football midfielders
Israeli footballers
Jewish French sportspeople
French emigrants to Israel
Jewish footballers
AS Nancy Lorraine players
Nîmes Olympique players
Angers SCO players
AS Cannes players
US Créteil-Lusitanos players
Stade de Reims players
Maccabi Tel Aviv F.C. players
Hapoel Petah Tikva F.C. players
Hapoel Ramat Gan F.C. players
Hapoel Ashkelon F.C. players
Maccabi Ahi Nazareth F.C. players
Shimshon Tel Aviv F.C. players
Footballers from Val-d'Oise
Israeli Premier League players
Liga Leumit players
People from Sarcelles